Shaapit is a 2010 Indian Hindi-language romantic horror adventure film directed by Vikram Bhatt, starring Aditya Narayan, Rahul Dev, Shweta Agarwal and Shubh Joshi in the lead roles. The film is based on the story of a family whose daughters have been carrying a curse from generation to generation. It also stars Murli Sharma and Nishigandha Wad. This film was shot in Film City and released on 19 March 2010, under the banner of ASA Film Pvt Ltd.

Plot
Aman, seemingly lifeless, narrates how he and his sweetheart Kaya are doomed to perish together. He remembers happier times when he met and courted and finally proposed to Kaya. No sooner than he had proposed, they had met with a sudden car accident. They are miraculously unhurt, saved with few minor injuries. But when Kaya's parents realise Aman had proposed to her, they become sad and grave, and Kaya's mother earnestly persuades her father to tell them the truth.

Kaya's mother reveals the curse upon their family. Kaya's father is a descendant of an ancient royal family. Some 300 years ago, the brother of the late king Rana Ranjit Singh had attempted to molest a beautiful girl in the palace. The girl escaped and jumped to her death. It turned out that the girl was the daughter of the royal guru, "Acharya Sachidanand", and that the girl was about to be wed. The acharya, a wise and powerful spiritual master, was enraged beyond belief. He pronounced a terrible curse upon Ranjit Singh: no daughter in Ranjit Singh's line shall ever enjoy marriage; if they ever attempt to marry or become engaged, they will immediately meet with death.

Aman and Kaya are devastated. They reach out to professor Pashupati, an expert in the occult. The professor explains that generational curses (such as the one upon Kaya) are typically connected with an evil spirit. This spirit is the keeper of the curse, and it executes the curse (by taking the lives of the victims). Aman recollects that the evil spirit had caused their car accident. Aman suggested destroying the spirit. The bemused professor laughs this off and urges Aman to forget Kaya and move on. Aman and his friend Shubh are disappointed.

Aman is persistent. He looks up some of the professor's work and retrieves (in a dangerous chase with an evil spirit) a "cursed" book from the library. Convinced that Aman is determined and capable, the professor agrees to help them. Their first stop is an abandoned cinema. The professor explains that it is haunted by several spirits, and some of the noble spirits may be able to help them locate the evil curse-keeper. Aman and Kaya enter the theatre. They are surrounded by spirits, and one of them splatters a few drops of blood on Kaya's wrists. The professor interprets: the drops are the coordinates of the ancient kingdom of Magha, present-day Mahipalpur.

They arrive at Mahipalpur and settle into the decrepit government guest house. The evil spirit is relentless. It attacks Kaya and tries to bury her alive. They save her just in time, but she goes into hypoxic shock. The professor describes a water-immersion method to send Shubh back in time. Shubh is again attacked by the spirit, but this time he returns with an amulet. The amulet reveals the clue that leads them to Rani Mohini, the evil spirit, the keeper of the curse.

Aided by the curator of the 300-year-old Magha jail, the professor performs a seance to invoke the spirit of Ranjit Singh. This spirit reveals the sinister history of the royal family. Rani Mohini was never satisfied with her station as the second wife of Raja Gajsingh. She was also a sorceress. She plotted to assassinate the King and his two sons, Rana Ranjeet Singh and Kuljeet. Her assassins killed Raja Gajsingh but were ultimately defeated and killed by the royal guard. Ranjit Singh ascended the throne, and, upon learning of Rani Mohini's dark powers, promptly arranged to execute her. Rani Mohini, however, created a black charm (locked in an amulet) to keep her soul on earth. Upon her execution, her soul became the keeper of the curse (by Acharya Sachidanand) and would torment Ranjit Singh's family forever.

Kaya's conditions worsen. She is wheeled into surgery. The professor, Aman, and Shubh hurry into the River Palace to confront the evil spirit of Rani Mohini. They connect the clues from the amulet and from Ranjit Singh and deduce that the spirit of Mohini can be dispatched to the nether world only when her mortal remains (ashes) are dissolved. Aman & Shubh start searching for the ashes with the professor's help. They then stumble upon a portrait statue wherein they find 8 earthen pots instead of seven. Shubh & Aman conclude that the ashes are hidden over there. They retrieve the pot but Mohini's spirit kills the professor brutally and chases them to destroy their efforts. After a difficult and lengthy battle with the spirit, Aman floods the River Palace. He nearly drowns, but Shubh saves him just in time. The film ends with Aman narrating how the power of love can overcome any obstacle. At the end of the movie, they got married and blessed with a baby girl.

Cast
 Aditya Narayan as Aman Bhargav
 Shweta Agarwal as Kaaya Shekhawat
 Rahul Dev as Professor Pasupathy
 Shubh Joshi as Shubh
 Murli Sharma as Kaaya's Father
 Nishigandha Wad as Kaaya's Mother
 Prithvi Zutshi as Aman's Father
 Natasha Sinha as Rani Mohini
 Ashok Beniwal as Raza, Curator of Jail Museum
 Sanjay Sharma
 Mamik Singh

Soundtrack
The music is composed by Chirantan Bhatt, Aditya Narayan and Najam Sheraz.

Track listing

Reception
The Times of India rated the film three stars out of five and considered that: "The film works not so much due to its story. Rather, it's the way Vikram Bhatt tells his story -- with a certain polish and pizzazz -- that draws you in. Also, it's Pravin Bhatt's multi-hued cinematography which adds a lyrical quality to the film. Not much of a debut however for Shweta Agarwal, who spends much of the screen time in comatose, though Aditya Narain is adequate."

The Indian Express gave the film one star out of five and Shubhra Gupta wrote: "Practically nothing about `Shaapit', which has the youngest looking debutant hero after Shahid Kapoor, is scary : not the bag of skeletons which floats around a 300 year old castle, not the wailing and the screeching, and the moaning and the groaning."

Mid-Day considered: "The basic plot of the film seems lost somewhere the curse and the evil spirit are supposed to have a connection but that remains unexplained. It's almost like two separate tracks in the same film and that makes it hard to comprehend" and  commented "The director's scare tactics work big time in the first half the sequence with Aman alone in the library is the most thrilling of the lot. Also, Shaapit is a combination of a love story and a horror flick and it works." Mid Day rated the film two and a half stars out of five.

Taran Adarsh writing for Bollywood Hungama commented: "With SHAAPIT, Vikram Bhatt raises the bar for horror films made in India. Full marks to Bhatt for making that one kick-ass horror thriller, which easily ranks amongst the best in this genre in terms of plot, setting, technique and performances" and ranked the film three and a half stars out of five.

Awards and nominations

2011 Zee Cine Awards
Nominated
Best Male Debut – Aditya Narayan

 3rd Mirchi Music Awards
Nominated
Upcoming Male Vocalist of The Year - Najam Sheraz - "Tere Bina Jiya Na Jaye"

References

External links

2010 films
2010s Hindi-language films
Films about curses
Films directed by Vikram Bhatt
Indian ghost films
Indian romantic horror films